Alex Troop is a retired Canadian football player who played for the Ottawa Rough Riders. He previously played at Wilfrid Laurier University.

References

Living people
Year of birth missing (living people)
Canadian football linebackers
Wilfrid Laurier Golden Hawks football players
Ottawa Rough Riders players